Cathedral Arcade is a heritage shopping arcade in Melbourne, Victoria, Australia. 

It forms a short, narrow laneway, connecting Swanston Street to Flinders Lane in the Melbourne central business district. It is a T-shaped arcade, however one of the laneways terminates inside the building.  

The arcade is notable as it retains all of its original features. The arcade is fully covered by stained glass and leadlights, which forms a highly detailed arch leading to a central dome. The floors are decorated with ceramic tiles, and the shopfronts feature richly detailed wood panels.

The art deco arcade, which dates back to 1925, is part of the Nicholas Building, an early interwar palazzo skyscraper designed by Harry Norris. The building itself, including the arcade is listed on the Victorian Heritage Register.

References

External links

Buildings and structures in Melbourne City Centre
Shopping arcades in Australia
Shopping centres in Melbourne
Heritage-listed buildings in Melbourne
Shopping malls established in 1925
1925 establishments in Australia
Art Deco architecture in Melbourne